Glen Stanley Smith (November 17, 1928 – September 29, 2019) was an American basketball player, known for his All-American college career at the University of Utah in the 1950s.

Smith played at Granite High School in South Salt Lake, Utah before matriculating at Utah to play for coach Vadal Peterson. An undersized center known for his ambidextrous play, Smith establishes himself as a top scorer in the Skyline Conference in his three varsity seasons. After averaging 18.9 points per game in his senior year, Smith was named a first-team All-American by the National Association of Basketball Coaches in Collier's magazine and a second-team All-American by Look magazine. Smith left Utah holding school and conference records for single season scoring, as well as the Skyline record for most points in a game.

Following the close of his college career, Smith played for the Denver Central Bankers team in the National Industrial Basketball League (NIBL) and Amateur Athletic Union (AAU). Smith was named the NIBL Most Valuable Player for the 1952–53 season and an AAU All-American the following year.

Smith died on September 29, 2019 in Salt Lake City at age 90.

References

External links
College stats @ sports-reference.com

1928 births
2019 deaths
All-American college men's basketball players
Amateur Athletic Union men's basketball players
American men's basketball players
Basketball players from Utah
Centers (basketball)
Latter Day Saints from Utah
People from Murray, Utah
Philadelphia Warriors draft picks
Utah Utes men's basketball players